Sub Pop 200 is a compilation released in the early days of the Seattle grunge scene (December 1988). It features songs (many of them first releases and otherwise unattainable) from Tad, The Fluid, Nirvana, Steven "Jesse" Bernstein, Mudhoney, The Walkabouts, Terry Lee Hale, Soundgarden, Green River, Fastbacks, Blood Circus, Swallow, Chemistry Set, Girl Trouble, The Nights and Days, Cat Butt, Beat Happening, Screaming Trees, Steve Fisk, and The Thrown Ups.

Many of these bands went on to be influential in the early 1990s and onwards. Most notable of these were Nirvana, Soundgarden, Green River (who spawned Mudhoney and Mother Love Bone and later Temple of the Dog and Pearl Jam), Screaming Trees, and Mudhoney.

The cover is an illustration by comics artist Charles Burns, who was regularly used by Sub Pop for covers and posters.

Track listing
"Sex God Missy" - Tad
"Is It Day I'm Seeing?" - The Fluid
"Spank Thru" - Nirvana
"Come Out Tonight" - Steven J. Bernstein
"The Rose" – Mudhoney (Amanda McBroom cover)
"Got No Chains" – The Walkabouts
"Dead Is Dead" – Terry Lee Hale
"Sub Pop Rock City" – Soundgarden
"Hangin' Tree" – Green River
"Swallow My Pride" – Fastbacks (Green River cover)
"The Outback" – Blood Circus
"Zoo" – Swallow
"Underground" – Chemistry Set
"Gonna Find a Cave" – Girl Trouble
"Split" – The Nights and Days
"Big Cigar" – Cat Butt
"Pajama Party in a Haunted Hive" – Beat Happening
"Love or Confusion" – Screaming Trees (Jimi Hendrix cover)
"Untitled" – Steve Fisk
"You Lost It" – The Thrown Ups

Availability
Sub Pop 200 was originally pressed on vinyl as a 3-LP box, but a CD reissue is available and in print.

See also
Sub Pop 100
Sub Pop 1000

References

Grunge compilation albums
Record label compilation albums
1988 compilation albums
Alternative rock compilation albums
Sub Pop compilation albums
Albums produced by Jack Endino